Delabere is a surname. Notable people with the surname include:

John Delabere (before 1559–1607), English politician
Richard Delabere (1559–1636), English politician